Brian A. De Peña is an American politician. He is the current mayor of Lawrence, Massachusetts. In 2021, he defeated acting mayor Kendrys Vasquez in the November general election.

Electoral results

References

External links
Legislative profile

21st-century American politicians
American politicians of Dominican Republic descent
Hispanic and Latino American mayors
Living people
Massachusetts Democrats
Massachusetts city council members
People from Lawrence, Massachusetts
Mayors of Lawrence, Massachusetts
Year of birth missing (living people)